The 1991 season was São Paulo's 62nd season since club's existence.

Statistics

Scorers

Transfers

July

Overall

{|class="wikitable"
|-
|Games played || 69 (23 Campeonato Brasileiro, 34 Campeonato Paulista, 12 Friendly match)
|-
|Games won || 37 (12 Campeonato Brasileiro, 21 Campeonato Paulista, 4 Friendly match)
|-
|Games drawn || 24 (7 Campeonato Brasileiro, 12 Campeonato Paulista, 5 Friendly match)
|-
|Games lost || 8 (4 Campeonato Brasileiro, 1 Campeonato Paulista, 3 Friendly match)
|-
|Goals scored || 109
|-
|Goals conceded || 55
|-
|Goal difference || +54
|-
|Best result || 5–0 (A) v Catanduvense - Campeonato Paulista - 1991.09.185–0 (H) v São José - Campeonato Paulista - 1991.10.12
|-
|Worst result || 1–4 (H) v Internacional - Campeonato Paulista - 1991.10.09
|-
|Top scorer || Raí (28)
|-

Friendlies

Troféo Naranja

Troféo Ciutat de Barcelona

Official competitions

Campeonato Brasileiro

League table

Matches

Semifinals

Finals

Final standings

Record

Campeonato Paulista

League table

Matches

Second stage

Matches

Finals

Record

External links
official website 

Sao Paulo
São Paulo FC seasons